The F. Ascaso was a semi-automatic pistol designed and produced in Catalonia during the Spanish Civil War. Its name comes from the Anarcho-syndicalist Francisco Ascaso Abadía. It was a copy of the Astra 400, but with a lower quality, even though it had a good design.

The weapon production started in 1937 and they were produced to the anarchist militias. It had a total production of between 5,000 and 8,000 units.

See also
 AAC-1937
 Labora Fontbernat M-1938

References

Bibliography
 Records de Terrassa – La F. Ascaso, una pistola fabricada a Terrassa

Catalonia
Semi-automatic pistols of Spain
9mm Largo firearms